Summit Mall is a one-story,   enclosed shopping mall located at 3265 W. Market Street in the Akron suburb of Fairlawn. , and with the closing of both Chapel Hill Mall and Rolling Acres Mall, is the only remaining mall in Summit County.

Edward J. DeBartolo Sr.'s DeBartolo Corporation built the mall, which opened on October 28, 1965. Today, it is owned by Simon Property Group. Currently, Summit Mall contains about 102 stores and a food court; anchor stores include Macy's and two Dillard's locations (Dillard's and Dillard's Women's).

History 
DeBartolo Corporation developed Summit Mall. First announced in 1963, the mall opened to the public in 1965. The original anchor stores were Cleveland, Ohio-based Halle Brothers Co. and two other department stores both based in Akron: O'Neil's and Polsky's. Other major tenants included Woolworth, Kroger, and Acme Markets.

After Halle's 1982 shutdown, their location was transferred to Higbee's, which operated the store until it was taken over by Dillard's in late 1992. It was a full-line location (without housewares) until 1998 when the men's department relocated to the top floor of the former Polsky's / Jewel Mart space (see below). When Dillard's took possession of the North store, the men's department and housewares relocated back to the south store which was renovated in 2005–2006.

O'Neil's became May Company Ohio in 1989, Kaufmann's in 1993, and Macy's in 2006.

After Polsky's closed, Jewel Mart occupied the main floor level. In July 1986, a Dallas businessman proposed opening a laser tag facility in the basement of the former Polksy's. By July 1990, Rizzi's Ristorante and Pizzeria and Charlotte's West occupied the space on the half-vacant lower level. Jewel Mart was gone by 1991 and the top floor remained vacant until Dillard's moved their men's store and started a housewares department on the upper level in 1998. Rizzi's and Charlotte's West were both gone by 2004, giving Dillard's the opportunity to renovate both floors as a Dillard's Women's store.

Summit Mall used to include a small movie theater.  In July 1989, National Theatre Corporation (now Regal Entertainment Group) closed the two-screen theater at the mall when General Cinemas opened up a new theater at West Market Plaza. National Theater Corp. later opened a new theater in Montrose.
In January 2013, Williams Sonoma announced it would close its location in the mall. Four years later, Ann Taylor announced that it will close at the mall.
In 2021, the mall announced that the new stores will have plans.

References

Further reading

Shopping malls in Ohio
Simon Property Group
Shopping malls established in 1965
Buildings and structures in Summit County, Ohio
Tourist attractions in Summit County, Ohio
1965 establishments in Ohio